47th CAS Awards
February 19, 2011

Theatrical Releases: 
True Grit

The 47th Cinema Audio Society Awards, which were held on February 19, 2011, honored the outstanding achievements in sound mixing in film and television of 2010.

Winners and nominees

Film
 True Grit — Peter F. Kurland, Skip Lievsay, Craig Berkey, and Greg Orloff Black Swan — Ken Ishii, Dominick Tavella, and Craig Henighan
 Inception — Ed Novick, Lora Hirschberg, and Gary Rizzo
 Shutter Island — Petur Hliddal and Tom Fleishman
 The Social Network — Mark Weingarten, Ren Klyce, David Parker, and Michael Semanick

Television
Series
 Boardwalk Empire (Episode: "A Return to Normalcy") 24 (Episode: "3:00 p.m. – 4:00 p.m.")
 Dexter (Episode: "Take It!")
 Glee (Episode: "The Power of Madonna")
 Modern Family (Episode: "Chirp")

Miniseries or Television Film
 Temple Grandin
 The Pacific (Episode: "Basilone")
 The Pacific (Episode: "Iwo Jima")
 The Pacific (Episode: "Okinawa")
 The Pacific'' (Episode: "Peleliu Landing")

References

2010 film awards
2010 television awards
2010 guild awards
Cinema Audio Society Awards
2011 in American cinema